Rowd (Sunshine) is a 2012 Indian Assamese romantic film directed by Gautam Baruah, with a screenplay by Ashim Krishna, Rupam Dutta, and Chirantan Mahanta, and produced by Mousumi Bordoloi. It stars Utpal Das, Diganta Hazarika, Moonmi Phukan and Monali Bordoloi in the lead roles. It was the debut film for both the director and actress Monali.

Synopsis
A young boy Ankit from a middle-class family who stays in Manali with his parents falls in love with Pooja, a girl from a rich powerful family. Then he faces many challenges in his life.

Cast
 Utpal Das as Ankit
 Diganta Hazarika as Angshuman
 Moonmi Phukan as Emon
 Monali Bordoloi as Pooja
 Bhagawat Pritam as Rudra Pratap Chaliha
 Biju Phukan 
 Nikumoni Baruah
 Jayanta Bhagawati
 Padmaraag Goswami
 Hiranya Deka

Soundtrack

The music of Rowd is composed by Jatin Sharma. Lyrics were by Rajdweep, Jananjay Saikia and Manas Mahanta.

References

External links

Film Review
Film Review

Films set in Assam
2010s Assamese-language films